Lesingey Round is a ringfort, a smaller type of hillfort, about  west of Penzance, in Cornwall, England. It is a scheduled monument.

A 'round', the name for a ringfort in Cornwall where they are common, is a small circular embanked enclosure, with one entrance; they date from the late Iron Age to the early post-Roman period.

Description
Lesingey Round is situated at the summit of a hill. The area of the site is wooded. As the inner slope of the rampart is absent in places, the location of the entrance is not known. There are no visible traces of occupation inside.

In 1584 the topographer John Norden referred to an ancient ruined castle on a mound near Penzance, calling it Castle Horneck; he may have been describing this site, which suggests that the site was occupied in the medieval period.

Cornish 'Horn' and 'Hornek' are 'Iron' in English, so 'Castle Horneck' would have some kind of translation as 'Iron Castle'.

Lesingey Round is colloquially known as 'Bluebell Dell' and, although it is probably not technically a 'Dell' (in fact it is surprisingly elevated, and quite a step up so easily understood to be a fort) it is always full with bluebells each spring.

References

Hill forts in Cornwall
Penwith
Scheduled monuments in Cornwall